Krzysztof Kamil Gawkowski (born 11 April 1980, Warsaw) is a Polish politician and writer.

Associated with Democratic Left Alliance, Spring, since 2019 he is a leader of The Left parliamentary club. He is a member of the Sejm (9th term).

Memoir 
Gawkowski grew up in Wołomin, Poland. He graduated law at University of Warsaw and in 2006 graduated in political studies at University of Communication and Social Media in Warsaw. He declares he is a Catholic.

Politics 
As a teenager in the 1990s he was a member of the Young Social Democrats Federation., and at 20, he joined the Democratic Left Alliance (SLD), the then-dominant party in Poland. In 2002 and 2004 he was a councillor in the town of Wołomin, near Warsaw. At the 2010 Polish local elections he was elected at the Masovian Regional Assembly for SLD. The next year he was a candidate for Parliament (Sejm).

In 2016 he was appointed as co-leader of the Democratic Left Alliance. However, after almost twenty years he gave up his affiliation with the Alliance.

In 2019, Gawkowski started to cooperate with Robert Biedroń who headed the left-wing umbrella party Lewica. In May he was a candidate to the European Parliament but was not one of the 3 left-wing candidates elected. However in October of the same year, he was a candidate to the Sejm for the Bydgoszcz constituency in the North-West, and was elected (see List of 9th term Sejm MPs). He was appointed Leader of the parliamentary club.

Writer 
He has written a few poetic and academic books.

Poetry 
 "Cień Przeszłości", Warszawska Firma Wydawnicza, Warszawa 2018, 
 "Piętno prawdy", Warszawska Firma Wydawnicza, Warszawa 2010,

Academic books 
 "Obudzić państwo", Warszawska Firma Wydawnicza, Warszawa 2015, 
 "Cyberkolonializm", Helion, Gliwice 2018, 
 "Administracja samorządowa w teorii i praktyce", Wydawnictwo Adam Marszałek, Toruń 2017,

References 

Spring (political party)
1980 births
Democratic Left Alliance politicians
Living people
People from Wołomin
Members of the Polish Sejm 2019–2023
University of Warsaw alumni
Polish Roman Catholics